Chekhrak is a rural locality (a settlement) in Dmitriyevskoye Rural Settlement of Koshekhablsky District, Adygea, Russia. The population was 506 as of 2018. There are 10 streets.

Geography 
Chekhrak is located 12 km northwest of Koshekhabl (the district's administrative centre) by road. Druzhba is the nearest rural locality.

References 

Rural localities in Koshekhablsky District